Eli Biham is an Israeli cryptographer and cryptanalyst, currently a professor at the Technion - Israel Institute of Technology Computer Science department. Starting from October 2008 and till 2013, Biham was the dean of the Technion Computer Science department, after serving for two years as chief of CS graduate school.
Biham received his Ph.D. for inventing (publicly) differential cryptanalysis, while working under Adi Shamir. It had, it turned out, been invented at least twice before. A team at IBM discovered it during their work on DES, and was requested/required to keep their discovery secret by the NSA, who evidently knew about it as well.

Contributions to cryptanalysis
Among his many contributions to cryptanalysis one can count:

 differential cryptanalysis - publicly invented during his Ph.D. studies under Adi Shamir
 Attacking all triple modes of operation.
 impossible differential cryptanalysis - joint work with Adi Shamir and Alex Biryukov
 Breaking (together with Lars Knudsen) the ANSI X9.52 CBCM mode (few days before the final standardization)
 Breaking the GSM security mechanisms (with Elad Barkan and Nathan Keller)
 Co-invention of related-key attacks.
 Differential Fault Analysis - joint work with Adi Shamir

New cryptographic primitives
Biham has taken part in the design of several new cryptographic primitives:

 Serpent (with Ross Anderson and Lars Knudsen), a block cipher  which was one of the final five contenders to become the Advanced Encryption Standard
 Tiger (with Ross Anderson), a hash function fast on 64-bit machines, and
 Py (with Jennifer Seberry), one of a family of fast stream ciphers (see article for more detail on their cryptanalytic status).
 SHAvite-3 (with Orr Dunkelman), a hash function which was one of the 14 semifinalists in the NIST hash function competition.

External links 
 Eli Biham's homepage at Technion

Modern cryptographers
Israeli computer scientists
Living people
Biham Eli
Biham Eli
Israeli Jews
International Association for Cryptologic Research fellows
1960 births